Frances Lillian Ilg (1902– July 26, 1981) was an American pediatrician and professor at Yale University. She was an expert in infant and child development, as co-founder and director of the Gesell Institute of Child Development.

Early life and education 
Frances Ilg was born in Oak Park, Illinois, the daughter of Joseph Frank Ilg and Leonore Petersen Ilg. Her father worked for the railroad; her maternal grandparents were born in Norway.  She graduated from Wellesley College in 1925. She trained as a physician at Cornell Medical School, earning her medical degree in 1929.

Career 
Ilg was an assistant professor of child development of Yale University from 1937 to 1947. In 1950, she co-founded the Gesell Institute in New Haven with two colleagues, psychologist Louise Bates Ames and Janet Learned Rodell. She also wrote a newspaper column, "Child Behavior", which was syndicated nationally. In the 1950s and 1960s she counseled parents to "enjoy their children" and "guard their sense of fun and sense of humor"; she also advised school districts to consider emotional maturity as well as intellectual development in grade placements. "We have been over-emphasizing the gifted child," she said. In 1957 she received the William Freeman Snow Award from the American Social Hygiene Association, for "distinguished service to humanity."

Works
 The first five years of life: a guide to the study of the preschool child, from the Yale clinic of child development, 1940
 (with Arnold Gesell) Child development, an introduction to the study of human growth, 1943
 Vision, its development in infant and child, 1946
 (with Arnold Gesell) The child from five to ten, 1946
 L'Enfant de 5 à 10 ans, 1949
 Child behavior, 1951
 The Gesell Institute party book, 1959
 Parents ask, 1962
 (with Louise Bates Ames) Mosaic patterns of American children, 1962
 School readiness; behavior tests used at the Gesell Institute, 1964
 Your four-year-old: wild and wonderful, 1976
 Your three-year-old: friend or enemy, 1976
 Your six-year-old: defiant but loving, 1979
 Your five-year-old: sunny and serene, 1979

Personal life 
Ilg adopted a daughter, Tordis, in 1938. Ilg died in 1981, aged 78 years, while vacationing in Manitowish Waters, Wisconsin.

References

1902 births
1982 deaths
American pediatricians
Women pediatricians
American developmental psychologists
Yale University faculty
People from Oak Park, Illinois
Wellesley College alumni